Muhammad Aslam Khan (6 April 1923 – 22 January 1994; Urdu: محمد اسلم خان) was a two-star General (Major General) of Pakistan Army who served in the health sectors of both military and civil service. He has received various national awards, including Sitara-e-Imtiaz and Hilal-e-Imtiaz for his meritorious services to Pakistan.

Background and education 
Known as 'General Sahib', he was born in Peshawar NWFP into a family of Pathans belonging to the sub caste of Akbar Khels (Khalil Mohmand) settled in Peshawar. He obtained his education from Islamia High School Peshawar, Government College Lahore and then completed MBBS from King Edward's Medical College, Lahore Punjab at the age of 21.

M. Aslam Khan was commissioned before independence of Pakistan in Army Medical Corps of the British Indian Army (14 July 1944) and soon after his commission he was sent to Italy where he served in various medical units and military hospitals during World War II.

References

Footnotes

Sources
 History of Army Medical Corps, 2015; pp. 175 (Table: DMS Air),pp. 512 (Group Photograph) and pp. 827 (Chapter: 33) 
 History of Pakistan Air Force (1947-1982). Syed Shabbir Hussain and M. Tariq Qureshi. 1st Edition, May 1982; pp. 64 (sub heading: PAF Base Masroor). 
 Daily Frontier Post Peshawar Pakistan, Newspaper. 22 January 1996 pp2.
 History of Khyber Medical Colleges And Its Related Institutions. Dr. Ghulam Taqi Bangash; pp. 274 (Figure LV. Student Union: 1975-76), pp. 502 (Appendix FIVE - No. 25)

1923 births
1994 deaths
Pakistani military leaders